Henry J. A. Sire (born 1949) is a Spanish-born British historian, Catholic author and a former Knight of the Sovereign Military Order of Malta. He was suspended and later expelled from the Order.

Life
Sire, who has French ancestry, was born in Barcelona in the mid-twentieth century. He was educated at Stonyhurst College in Lancashire and Exeter College, Oxford, where he read history. Sire joined the Order of Malta in 2001 and was contracted to write a history of the Order. He lived in the Order's headquarters in Rome from 2013 to 2017. The history was published in 2016. He has established himself as a traditionalist Catholic, critical of innovations which he considers discordant with the Church's tradition and consistent teaching.

In 2015, Sire published Phoenix from the Ashes: The Making, Unmaking, and Restoration of Catholic Tradition, a highly critical approach to the Second Vatican Council and its effects on the Catholic Church, in which he concludes: "The fact needs to be clearly stated: the Second Vatican Council was a betrayal of the Church's faith. Its consequences cannot be put right until that betrayal has been recognized and reversed."

In 2017, under the pen-name "Marcantonio Colonna", Sire published (initially as a self-publication) a book entitled The Dictator Pope, in which he criticized the pontificate of Pope Francis. Sire revealed his authorship in March 2018, one month before the publication of the revised and updated English edition, resulting in his suspension from the Order of Malta. On November 19, 2018,  Fra’ Giacomo Dalla Torre, the Grand Master of the Sovereign Order of the Knights of Malta, issued a decree expelling Sire stating that " the Order of Malta dissociates itself from the positions conveyed and considers the content of the book a grave offence to His Holiness, Pope Francis ". However, Sire plans to appeal this decision.

Bibliography
 Gentlemen Philosophers: Catholic Higher Education at Liège and Stonyhurst, 1774–1916, Churchman, 1988
 The Knights of Malta, Yale University Press, 1994
 Father Martin D'Arcy : Philosopher of Christian Love, Gracewing, 1997
 Phoenix from the Ashes: The Making, Unmaking, and Restoration of Catholic Tradition, Angelico Press, 2015
 The Knights of Malta: A Modern Resurrection, Profile Books, 2016
 The Dictator Pope: The Inside Story of the Francis Papacy, Regnery Publishing (Revised and updated edition), 2018

Notes

References

Alumni of Exeter College, Oxford
Living people
1949 births
British historians
British people of French descent
British people of Spanish descent
British male writers
British Roman Catholic writers
British traditionalist Catholics
Pseudonymous writers